The 2014 United States House of Representatives elections in Tennessee was held on Tuesday, November 4, 2014, to elect the nine U.S. representatives from the state of Tennessee, one from each of the state's nine congressional districts. The elections coincided with the elections of other federal and state offices, including a gubernatorial election and an election to the U.S. Senate.

The primary election for House seats was held on August 7, 2014. Following the general elections, no seats changed hands, leaving the Tennessee delegation at a 7-2 Republican majority.

Overview

By district
Results of the 2014 United States House of Representatives elections in Tennessee by district:

District 1

Republican primary

Results

General election

District 2

Republican primary

Results

Democratic primary

Results

General election

District 3
Republican Chuck Fleischmann has represented Tennessee's 3rd congressional district since 2011.

He is being challenged in the primary by businessman Weston Wamp, the son of Fleischmann's predecessor Zach Wamp, who came third in the primary in 2012.

Republican primary

Results

Democratic primary

Results

General election

District 4
Republican Scott DesJarlais has represented Tennessee's 4th congressional district since 2011. He was considered one of the most vulnerable Congressmen after revelations emerged in October 2012 that he had prescribed drugs to a patient with whom he was having an affair and had pressured his former wife and former mistress to have several abortions. He was re-elected in 2012 with a reduced majority. Despite these vulnerabilities, in the final days before the August 7 primary, DesJarlais seemed to have a chance at holding onto his seat, according to GOP operatives who think voters have forgiven his poor behavior.

Republican primary
State Senator Jim Tracy challenged DesJarlais in the primary. As of the end of June 2013, Tracy had raised nearly $750,000 (including over $300,000 in the second quarter of 2013) for his bid. He raised an additional $150,000 in the fourth quarter and reported $840,000 cash-on-hand. By contrast, at the end of September, DesJarlais reported $170,000 cash-on-hand.

Murfreesboro resident and teacher Steve Lane announced that he would run against DesJarlais and seek the Republican nomination.

Fayetteville resident and Army veteran Michael Warden also announced he would seek the Republican Party nomination.

State Representative Joe Carr sought the nomination, but withdrew to run against Lamar Alexander in the Senate race instead. State Representative Kevin Brooks, former Bradley County Sheriff Tim Gobble; and Forrest Shoaf, a former executive at Cracker Barrel, may also seek the Republican nomination.

Polling

Results

Democratic primary

Results

General election

District 5

Republican primary

Results

Democratic primary

Results

General election

District 6

Republican primary

Results

Democratic primary

Results

General election

District 7

Republican primary

Results

Democratic primary

Results

General election

District 8

Republican primary

Results

Democratic primary

Results

General election

District 9

Republican primary

Results

Democratic primary

Results

General election

See also
 2014 United States House of Representatives elections
 2014 United States elections

References

External links
U.S. House elections in Tennessee, 2014 at Ballotpedia
Campaign contributions at OpenSecrets

Tennessee
2014
United States House of Representatives